Čukarica is a municipality of the city of Belgrade, Serbia.

Name
Like several other neighborhoods of Belgrade, Čukarica was named after kafana. At the present location of the Sugar Refinery, there was a kafana in the second half of the 19th century. It was very popular as it was located at the point where two roads, one from Obrenovac and other from Šumadija, meet at the entrance to Belgrade. It was owned by Stojko Čukar and after him the kafana was named “Čukareva kafana” which later gave name to the settlement.

History
The village of Čukarica asked to be transferred to the Belgrade municipality in 1906, but the plea was rejected. It was transferred from the Vračar Srez under the administration of the Belgrade municipality on 8 July 1907. Municipality of Čukarica was established for the first time on 30 December 1911. After a popular referendum, inhabitants of Čukarica voted to split from the municipality of Žarkovo and as a result were given the municipal status by the king Peter I of Serbia. Popular folklore rivalry still exists among the inhabitants of Čukarica and Žarkovo, even though today they are both part of Belgrade.

Modern settlement began to develop as the first social housing for the workers of the sugar refinery, on the hill above the hyppodrome. Čukarica became known as the “workers settlement”. The first president of the municipality was an industrialist with the surname Novak, who emigrated from the Czech Republic. He changed his surname to the Serbian version Novaković and his direct descendants are the actress Olivera Marković (granddaughter) and her son, director Goran Marković (great-grandson).

During the existence of the narrow-gauge railway Belgrade-Čukarica-Obrenovac, the tunnel was dug under the ending slope of the Banovo Brdo hill. There were two railway stations. Station Čukarica was located at the entry point from the Belgrade direction, at the sugar factory industrial complex. On the exit side, at Obrenovac Road, there was a station Jedek.

After the liberation in World War I in 1918, Čukarica administratively became part of Belgrade. After World War II when Belgrade municipalities were abolished and the city divided into raions in 1945, Čukarica became one of 5 administrative neighborhoods within Belgrade’s Raion VII. Municipalities were re-established in 1957. In 1960. the neighboring municipalities of Umka and Rakovica were incorporated into Čukarica, but Rakovica became a separate municipality again in 1974.

The Shell company built a large complex of oil tanks during the Interbellum in the northernmost section of Čukarica, Careva Ćuprija. The zone was heavily bombed during the Allied bombing of Yugoslavia in World War II. Especially heavy was the bombing on 3 July 1944. The tanks, and the wider area of old and north parts of Čukarica were carpet bombed, resulting in almost complete destruction of the old core of Čukarica. Rebuilt after the war, the tanks in time became known as the Jugopetrol tanks. As a result of bombing, numerous unexploded bombs remained buried in the ground, and are occasionally discovered during the modern construction works, like Ada Mall in 2018, or residential complex in Banovo Brdo in 2021, which required evacuation of couple of thousands of residents for safe extraction of the projectile.

Location
Čukarica is completely surrounded by other municipalities of Belgrade: it is bordered by the Sava river to the west, municipalities of Savski Venac to the north and northeast, Rakovica to the east, Voždovac to the southeast, Barajevo to the south and Obrenovac to the southwest.

Municipality is located southwest from the downtown Belgrade. It comprises the vast marshy woods of Makiš, on the eastern bank of the Sava river and the largest river island in Belgrade, Ada Ciganlija. At the suburb of Sremčica, Beogradski merokras, the most northern terrain made of limestone (karst) is located.

Several of the most important roads in western Serbia start here: Lazarevac Road, Ibar Highway, Sava Highway, New Obrenovac Road, Old Obrenovac Road, etc. Also, the largest and most important freight train station and marshalling yard in the area (Belgrade marshalling yard) and the main installations of the Belgrade waterworks, including the water factory, are located in the municipality (Makiš).

Čukarica was the first part of Belgrade that developed industry, in the late 19th and early 20th century and still is one of the most industrialized parts of Belgrade (Železnik, Žarkovo, Bele Vode), with commercial sections of the municipalities booming in the last 20 years (Banovo Brdo).

Officially the longest street in Belgrade, Obrenovački put (Obrenovac road) is located in the municipality. According to Belgrade's Directory of Roads, it is 11 kilometers long. However, as the road passes through the forests and mainly uninhabited areas and stretches outside the urban Belgrade City proper (uža teritorija grada), most Belgraders consider the 7.5-kilometer-long Bulevar kralja Aleksandra to be the longest street. While Obrenovac road runs only through one municipality (Čukarica), Bulevar kralja Aleksandra connects four of them: Stari Grad, Vračar, Palilula and Zvezdara.

Neighborhoods
The urban part of the municipality is completely within the Belgrade City proper, comprising many neighborhoods and sub-neighborhoods, some of which used to be separate towns until the 1970s before Belgrade expanded that much to make urban connection to them (Žarkovo, Železnik). The neighborhood of Čukarica, which gave the name to the entire municipality, is located on a hill above the eastern bank of the Sava river. It is bordered by Careva Ćuprija and Senjak to the north, Banovo Brdo.

This is a list of the neighborhoods that comprise the municipality:

The suburban part comprises seven suburban settlements, four of them classified as urban and three as rural settlements:

Demographics

The municipality has a population of 181,231 inhabitants, according to the 2011 census results. That makes Čukarica the second most populous municipality of Belgrade (after New Belgrade), but it is also the fastest growing one in terms of absolute growth of population (relative, about 1.05% annually). Despite having also a rural parts, the municipality is very densely populated – .

Ethnic groups
The ethnic composition of the municipality:

Economy
The following table gives a preview of total number of registered people employed in legal entities per their core activity (as of 2018):

Politics
Presidents of the Municipality since 1989:
 1989 – 1992: Predrag Petrović (b. 1950)
 1992 – Feb 1997: Vladimir Matić (b. 1957)
 February 1997 – 18 November 2004: Zoran Alimpić (b. 1965)
 18 November 2004 – 23 June 2008: Dragan Tešić (b. 1960)
 23 June 2008 – 6 June 2012: Milan Tlačinac (b. 1964)
 6 June 2012 – 19 March 2014: Zoran Gajić (b. 1967)
 19 March 2014 – present : Srđan Kolarić (b. 1965)

Twin towns - sister cities
Čukarica is twinned with:

 Bač, Serbia
 Berane, Montenegro
 Budva, Montenegro
 Ervenik, Croatia
 Heraklion, Greece
 Istočno Novo Sarajevo, Bosnia and Herzegovina
 Kumanovo, North Macedonia
 Sykies, Greece
 Thasos, Greece

See also
 Subdivisions of Belgrade
 List of Belgrade neighborhoods and suburbs

References

External links

 

Municipalities of Belgrade
Neighborhoods of Belgrade
Čukarica